The 13th Filmfare Awards were held in 1966, honoring the best in Hindi cinema in 1965. 

Himalaya Ki God Mein and Waqt led the ceremony with 7 nominations each, followed by Kaajal with 5 nominations and Khandan with 4 nominations.  

The ceremony was notable as Meena Kumari set a record for the most wins for Best Actress at Filmfare, winning her 4th award for Kaajal. The record has been matched by a few actresses including Nutan, Madhuri Dixit, Kajol, and Vidya Balan. Nutan and her niece Kajol are the only two actresses who broke the record held by Meena Kumari. 

Waqt won 5 awards, including Best Director (for Yash Chopra) and Best Supporting Actor (for Raaj Kumar), thus becoming the most-awarded film at the ceremony.

Raaj Kumar received dual nominations for Best Supporting Actor for his performances in Kaajal and Waqt, winning for the former.

Awards and nominees

Best Film
 Himalaya Ki God Mein 
Haqeeqat
Waqt

Best Director
 Yash Chopra – Waqt 
Chetan Anand – Haqeeqat
Ramanand Sagar – Arzoo

Best Actor
 Sunil Dutt – Khandan 
Raaj Kumar – Kaajal
Rajendra Kumar – Arzoo

Best Actress
 Meena Kumari – Kaajal 
Sadhana – Waqt
Mala Sinha – Himalaya Ki God Mein

Best Supporting Actor
 Raaj Kumar – Waqt 
Mehmood – Gumnaam
Raaj Kumar – Kaajal

Best Supporting Actress
 Padmini – Kaajal 
Helen – Gumnaam
Shashikala – Himalaya Ki God Mein

Best Story
 Waqt – Akhtar Mirza 
Arzoo – Ramanand Sagar
Kaajal – Gulshan Nanda

Best Dialogue
 Waqt – Akhtar-Ul-Iman

Best Music Director 
 Khandan – Ravi 
Arzoo – Shankar-Jaikishan
Himalaya Ki God Mein – Kalyanji-Anandji

Best Lyricist
 Khandan – Rajendra Krishan for Tumhi Mere Mandir 
Arzoo – Hasrat Jaipuri for Aji Rooth Kar Kahaan
Himalaya Ki God Mein – Indeevar for Ek Tu Naa Mila

Best Playback Singer
 Khandan – Lata Mangeshkar for Tumhi Mere Mandir 
Himalaya Ki God Mein – Lata Mangeshkar for Ek Tu Naa Mila
Kaajal – Mohammad Rafi for Choo Lene Do

Best Art Direction, B&W
 Haqeeqat

Best Art Direction, Color
 Gumnaam

Best Cinematography, B&W
 Yaadein

Best Cinematography, Color
 Waqt

Best Editing
 Himalaya Ki God Mein

Best Sound
 Yaadein

Biggest Winners
Waqt – 5/7
Khandan – 4/4
Kaajal – 2/6
Himalaya Ki God Mein – 2/7

See also
14th Filmfare Awards
15th Filmfare Awards
Filmfare Awards

References
https://www.imdb.com/event/ev0000245/1966/

Filmfare Awards
Filmfare
1966 in Indian cinema